Brigadier-General Colin Robert Ballard,  (20 July 1868 – 17 June 1941) was a Scottish officer in the British Army and a military author. For his World War I service in Romania, he was a recipient of several Romanian decorations.

Background and early life
Ballard was born in Cockpen, Midlothian, Scotland, the second son of General John Archibald Ballard (1829–1880), and his wife, Joanna, the daughter of Robert Scott-Moncrieff. Ballard spent his early life in Scotland and then in Kent before attending the United Services College, Westward Ho!, Devon in 1885.

Military career
According to the records of the India Office, Ballard was granted a Queen's India Cadetship (IOR/L/MIL/9/300/40) in 1887 but he must have decided against service in the Indian Army as he was commissioned a second lieutenant in the Norfolk Regiment on 11 February 1888, with a subsequent promotion to lieutenant on 23 April 1890. The Regiment were posted to Burma in 1891–1892 for which Ballard received the Burma Medal and Clasp, and were then posted to India in 1895 for which he received the India Medal with Relief of Chitral clasp. Subsequent service in the Tirah Campaign during 1897 and 1898 saw him mentioned in dispatches and promoted to captain on 1 May 1898.

The Norfolks were then posted to South Africa for service in the Second Boer War (1899–1902). Ballard was seconded as Station Commandant during 1899 and early 1900, with a brevet rank of major from 29 November 1899. He later became a Staff Officer in the Mounted Infantry Corps Mobile Column through to 1902. After the end of the war in June that year, he left Cape Town in the SS Bavarian in August, returning to Southampton the following month. For his service in the war, he received the Queen's South Africa Medal with 6 clasps and the King's South Africa Medal with both 1901 and 1902 Clasps. Following his return, he was back as a regular officer in the 1st battalion of his regiment. It was not long, however, before he was on the move again and this time Ballard found himself as Transport Officer for the Somaliland Field Force during 1903 and 1904 before being appointed Deputy Assistant Quartermaster General in Ceylon in 1905 and then Deputy Assistant Adjutant and Quartermaster General in Ceylon from 1905 until 1908.

Substantive promotion to Major finally occurred in 1908 and he then took up the post of a General Staff Officer Grade 2 at the 2nd London Division for 1909 and 1910 before moving as a General Staff Officer to the Staff College from 1911 to 1913.  Promotion to Lt Colonel came in 1913, giving him the opportunity to formally wear his father's "Colonel's Sword" bequeathed to him in 1880, and he was appointed Commander, 1st Norfolk Regiment and later 7th, 95th and 14th Infantry Brigades, British Expeditionary Force, France and Belgium, 1914-1916. It was whilst he was General Officer Commanding 57th Infantry Brigade in 1916 that he was wounded at the Battle of the Somme. His service in France & Flanders earned him three mentions in dispatches, a brevet Colonel promotion and, in common with his father and with his older brother Admiral George Alexander Ballard, appointment as a Companion of the Bath.  Ballard recovered from his wounds and was posted as Military Attaché to Romania from 1917 to 1918. For his services there, the Romanian government appointed him a Knight of the Order of the Star of Romania and he received the Collar of the Order of Carol I, the British Government appointed him a Companion of the Order of St Michael and St George.

For two years after the First World War, Ballard was Officer Commanding No 2 District, Scottish Command, 1919–1920 and from 1920 to 1923 he held the post of President of the Allied Police Commission in Constantinople. He retired in 1923 and occupied his time in writing a number of books.

Ballard died in 1941 and was survived by his wife.

Family
Ballard married at Llanbadarn Fawr, Ceredigion, near Aberystwyth, on 7 October 1902, Lizzie Emelia A. Jones, daughter of General Jenkin Jones, Royal Engineers, of Dolau, Aberystwyth. They had no children.

Publications 
 Russia in rule and misrule (John Murray, London, 1920)
 Napoleon, an outline (Duckworth and Co, London, 1924),
 Military genius of Abraham Lincoln (Oxford University Press, London, 1926),
 The great Earl of Peterborough (Skeffington and Son, London, 1926);
 Kitchener (Faber and Faber, London, 1930),
 Smith-Dorrien (Constable and Co, London, 1931);

References

 Cook, H. C. B. (ed.). "The Ballard letters : the Boer war writings of C.R. Ballard, part 1". Quarterly Bulletin of the South African Library, 45:4 (1991), 145-58. .
 Who Was Who; Oxford University Press

1868 births
1941 deaths
Military personnel from Midlothian
British Army brigadiers
People educated at United Services College
British Army personnel of the Second Boer War
Companions of the Order of the Bath
Companions of the Order of St Michael and St George
Knights of the Order of the Star of Romania
Royal Norfolk Regiment officers
British military personnel of the Chitral Expedition
British military personnel of the Tirah campaign
British Army generals of World War I
People from Midlothian
British military attachés